The following are some notable "Old Bristolians", alumni of Bristol Grammar School in England.

17th century
Robert Huntington (c.1637–1701), Provost of Trinity College, Dublin and orientalist

18th century
Alexander Catcott (1725–1779), geologist and theologian
Sir John Coxe Hippisley (1745–1825), politician
William Gregor (1761–1817), mineralogist, discoverer of titanium
Jonathan Sewell (c.1766–1839), Chief Justice and Speaker of the Legislative Council of Lower Canada, 1808–1839, and President of the Executive Council of Lower Canada, 1808–1830
Stephen Sewell (1770–1832), lawyer and political figure in Lower Canada
John Tobin (1770–1804), dramatist
Samuel Daniel Broughton (1787–1837), military surgeon
Thomas Edward Bowdich (c.1791–1824), writer and African explorer

19th century
Thomas William Allies (1813–1903), theologian
Charles Kingsley (1819–1875), novelist
John Norton (1823–1904), architect
Robert Drew Hicks (1850–1929), classicist
Charles Whibley (1859–1930), journalist and author
Thomas Horrocks Openshaw (1856–1929), surgeon
William Lane (1861–1917), journalist and pioneer of the Australian labour movement
Leonard Whibley (1863–1941), classicist
Sir Llewellyn Smith (1864–1945), Permanent Secretary of the Board of Trade, 1907–1919, and Chief Economic Adviser to the Government, 1919–1927
Leonard Raven-Hill (1867–1942), illustrator and cartoonist
Sir John Herbert Parsons FRS (1868–1957), ophthalmologist and physiologist
Robert Chambers (1802–1871), philanthropist and peace activist
Roland Allen (1868–1947), missionary in China
Cyril Bradley Rootham (1875–1938), classicist and musician
Frederick William Lumsden (1872–1918), Royal Marines Brigadier General, VC, CB and DSO & Three bars
Sir Cyril Norwood (1875–1956) classicist and Politician
Sir Douglas Veale (1891–1973), Registrar of the University of Oxford, 1930–1958

20th century
Sir Allen Lane (1902–1970), founder of Penguin Books
Douglas Cleverdon (1903–1987), bookseller and BBC Radio producer
Sir Ivor Jennings (1903–1965), Downing Professor of the Laws of England, University of Cambridge, 1962–1965
Paul Drury (1903–1987), artist
Oliver Franks, Baron Franks (1905–1992), philosopher, diplomat and civil servant
Sir Richard Sheppard (1910–1982), architect
Douglas Russell Feaver (1914–1987), Bishop of Peterborough
John Cosh (1915–2005), rheumatologist
Geoffrey Keen (1916–2005), actor
Sir John Pople (1925–2004), Mathematician, Theoretical chemist and Nobel Laureate
Peter Nichols (born 1927), writer
Peter Mathias (1928–2016), economic historian
Robert MacEwen (1928–2013), Scotland international rugby union player
Richard Lynn (born 1930), psychologist
Philip French (1933–2015), film critic and radio producer
Timothy West (born 1934), actor
Glen Dudbridge (1935–2017), sinologist
Robin Cormack (born 1935), academic
Julian Glover (born 1935), actor
David Prowse (born 1935), actor
Victor Watts (born 1938), academic
Keith Robbins (born 1940), historian and former Vice-Chancellor of the University of Wales, Lampeter
Fred Wedlock (1942–2010), folk singer, humorist and actor.
T.J. Clark (born 1943), historian
Nick Brimble (born 1944), actor
Robert Lacey (born 1944), historian and biographer
Sir Nicholas Wright (born 1945), professor of medicine
Jeremy Treglown (born 1946), biographer and literary critic
Andrew Dalby (born 1947), food writer
Clive Ponting (born 1947), former civil servant and historian.
David Nutt (born 1951), neuropsychopharmacologist
Sir Andrew Cash (born 1955), Chief Executive of Sheffield Teaching Hospitals NHS Foundation Trust
Timothy Holroyde (born 1955), English Court of Appeal judge
Jeremy Sheehy (born 1956), Anglican priest and academic
Andy Harrison (born 1957), business executive and former CEO of The RAC, easyJet and Whitbread
Shaun Woodward (born 1958), politician, former Labour Secretary of State for Northern Ireland
Graham Tomlin (born 1958), Bishop of Kensington
Nick Sheppard (born 1960), guitarist
Jeremy Northam (born 1961), actor
Tim Hayward (born 1963), food writer, broadcaster and restaurateur
John Lennard (born 1964), academic
Rabinder Singh KC (born 1964), first Sikh High Court judge
Janet Henry (born 1969), economist, currently Global Chief Economist at HSBC
Richard Gould (born 1970), chief executive of Surrey County Cricket Club
Neil Garrett (born 1975), journalist
Michelle Goodman (born 1976), RAF Officer, first woman to receive the Distinguished Flying Cross
Shrien Dewani (born 1979), arrested on suspicion of conspiring to murder
Simon Case (born 1978), civil servant
Sean Marsden (born 1980), professional rugby player
Mark Watson (born 1980), comedian
Alexander Betts (born 1980), academic
Chris Skidmore (born 1981), Conservative MP
James Kenber (born 1986), fencer 
Michael Coady (born 1987), professional rugby league player
Tuppence Middleton (born 1987), actress
Marcus Hamblett (born 1987), musician
William Tavaré (born 1990), professional cricketer
Emily Diamond (born 1991), track and field athlete
Jordan Waller (born 1992), actor
Katie Swan (born 1999), professional tennis player

References

 
Lists of people by English school affiliation
19th century in Bristol
20th century in Bristol
Old Bristolians